Schutte is a Dutch occupational surname derived from schutter, meaning "archer". The North German form of the name is Schütte or Schuette. People with these names include:

Schutte
 Alta Schutte, South African cardiology academic
Andries Schutte (born 1994), South African rugby player
 Arminda Schutte (1909–1995), Cuban classical pianist
 Bill Schutte (1910–1994), American football player and coach
 Carl Schutte (1887–1962), American road racing cyclist
 Clarence Schutte (1901–1970), American football player 
 Dan Schutte (born 1947), American composer
 Dick Schutte (born 1947), Dutch politician
 Dieter Schütte (1923-2013), German publisher
 Edwin Schutte (1906–1985), American basketball coach and dentist
 Frits Schutte (1897–1986), Dutch swimmer
 Gert Schutte (born 1939), Dutch politician
 Michael Schutte (born 1979), Canadian ice hockey player
 Mike Schutte (1950-2008), South African boxer and actor
 Nanette Schutte (born 1962), Dutch tennis player
 Loes Schutte  (born 1953), Dutch rower
 Ofelia Schutte (born 1945), American philosopher
 Paul Schutte (born 1989), Irish hurler
 Sidney Schutte (born 1976), Dutch chef
  (born 1963), Dutch journalist

Schütte
 Dieter Schütte (1923–2013), German publisher
 Friedhelm Schütte (born 1957), German footballer
 Gudmund Schütte (1872–1958), Danish philologist and historian
  (1873–1940), German engineer, founder of the Schütte-Lanz airship and airplane company
 Jan Schütte (born 1957), German film director and screenwriter
 Kurt Schütte (1909–1998), German mathematician (namesake of Feferman–Schütte ordinal)
 Ludwig Schütte (1912–1993), German army officer during World War II
 Margarete Schütte-Lihotzky (1897–2000), Austrian architect
 Thomas Schütte (born 1954), German artist

Schuette
 Bill Schuette (born 1953), American politician and attorney general of Michigan
 Bill G. Schuette, American politician
 Carl Schuette (1922–1975), American football player
 Charles Schuette (1878–1934), American Wisconsin state politician
 John Schuette (1837–1919), American Wisconsin state politician
 Paul Schuette (1906–1960), American football player
 Tom Schuette (born 1945), Canadian football player
 William Schuette (1933–2002), American sprint canoer

See also 
 Schut, surname of the same origin
 Schutt, surname of German origin
 Schutte's Creek, a branch of the Stout Creek, Michigan

Dutch-language surnames
German-language surnames